Joanna Boyles Fennema (born Joanna Bess Boyles; November 13, 1995) is a retired American soccer player who last played as a midfielder for Orlando Pride in the National Women's Soccer League.

She is the Assistant Soccer Coach of Columbus State Cougars.

Early life 
Fennema graduated from Sanderson High School in 2013 having chosen to solely concentrate on club soccer with CASL Chelsea Ladies.

College 
Fennema attended the University of North Carolina. In her first year with the Tar Heels she made 23 appearances all as a substitute. In 2014 she started in all 20 of her appearances. In 2016 she took a red-shirt season in order to recover from back-to-back ACL tears in both knees. She returned for her senior year in 2017, helping the team win the 2017 ACC Women's Soccer Tournament and was selected to the All-ACC Second team. Her college coach Anson Dorrance said Fennema was "technically my most gifted player.  Even if you look at our entire history of our brilliant technicians she ranks right up there with the Tobin Heaths and the Meghan Klingenbergs and some of the best technical players that we've ever had here at UNC."

Professional career

Chicago Red Stars
Fennema was drafted in the fourth round (32nd overall) of the 2018 NWSL College Draft by the Boston Breakers but the team folded one week later. She was picked up in the third round (25th overall) of the 2018 NWSL Dispersal Draft by the Chicago Red Stars. She spent the 2018 season with the team's reserves in the Women's Premier Soccer League.

Orlando Pride
Fennema joined Orlando Pride for the 2019 season, signing to their supplemental roster on April 10 after impressing new head coach Marc Skinner in preseason. She made her debut on April 14 in the team's season opener at home to Portland Thorns. On June 15, she scored her first goal for the team, a free kick in a 2–2 draw against Houston Dash.

Fennema retired from professional soccer after suffering a back injury on February 28, 2020.

International career 
Fennema represented the United States internationally at U-15 and U-17 level. In 2012 she won the CONCACAF U-17 Championship and was part of the squad that traveled to Azerbaijan for the U-17 World Cup.

In 2014, Fennema was called in regularly to train with the U-20 squad but was one of the final cuts before the 2014 U-20 World Cup.

Personal life
Formerly known as Joanna Boyles, she married Parker Fennema in November 2019 and began using her married name afterward.

Honors

College 
North Carolina Tar Heels
 ACC Women's Soccer Tournament: 2017

International 
 CONCACAF Women's U-17 Championship: 2012

References

External links 
 NWSL player profile
 UNC bio
 

1995 births
Living people
American women's soccer players
North Carolina Tar Heels women's soccer players
Orlando Pride players
National Women's Soccer League players
Soccer players from Raleigh, North Carolina
Women's association football midfielders
Boston Breakers draft picks
Soccer players from North Carolina